Tihomir Buinjac (born 28 February 1974) is a Croatian sprinter. He competed in the men's 4 × 100 metres relay at the 2000 Summer Olympics.

References

1974 births
Living people
Athletes (track and field) at the 2000 Summer Olympics
Croatian male sprinters
Olympic athletes of Croatia
Place of birth missing (living people)